The 2018–19 Al Ahly season was the 111th season in the football club's history and 60th consecutive and overall season in the top flight of Egyptian football, the Egyptian Premier League. In addition to the domestic league, Al Ahly also competed in this season's editions of the domestic cup, the Egypt Cup, the Egyptian Super Cup, the first-tier African cup, the CAF Champions League, and the first-tier Arab cup, the Arab Club Champions Cup. The season covered a period from 1 July 2018 to 30 June 2019; however Al Ahly played their first match of the season in March 2018 and played their last match in September 2019.

Kit information
Supplier: Umbro
Sponsors: Lava, WE, GLC Paints, Uber, Tiger Chips, Royal Dutch Shell

Players

Current squad

Out on loan

Transfers

Transfers in

Loans in

Transfers out

Loans out

Notes

Friendly matches

Saudi-Egyptian Super Cup

Competitions

Overview

Egyptian Premier League

League table

Results summary

Results by round

Matches

Egypt Cup

Egyptian Super Cup

CAF Champions League

2018 CAF Champions League

First round

Group A

Quarter-finals

Semi-finals

Final

2018–19 CAF Champions League

First round

Group D

Quarter-finals

Arab Club Champions Cup

First round

Second round

Statistics

Appearances and goals

! colspan="19" style="background:#DCDCDC; text-align:center" | Players joined during the 2019 summer transfer window
|-

! colspan="19" style="background:#DCDCDC; text-align:center" | Players transferred out during the season
|-

|}

Goalscorers

Clean sheets

References

Notes

Al Ahly SC seasons
Ahly